Norths may refer to:
 Norths Devils, an Australian rugby league football club based in Brisbane's Northern Suburbs
 North Sydney Bears, an Australian rugby league football club based in Sydney's Northern Suburbs